Strange Days at Blake Holsey High (also known as Black Hole High) is a Canadian science fiction television series which first aired in North America in October 2002 on Global TV. It is set at the fictional boarding school of the title, where a Science Club (five students and their teacher) investigates mysterious phenomena, most of which is centered on a wormhole located on the school grounds. Spanning four seasons, the series developed into a success, and has been sold to networks around the globe.

Created by Jim Rapsas, the series intertwines elements of mystery, drama, romance, and comedy. The writing of the show is structured around various scientific principles, with emotional and academic struggles combined with unfolding mysteries of a preternatural nature. In addition to its consistent popularity among children, it has been recognised by adults as strong family entertainment. Forty-two episodes of the series, each roughly twenty-five minutes in length, have been produced, the last three of which premiered in January 2006. Those three final episodes that aired were combined into a film, Strange Days: Conclusions. The show was filmed at the Auchmar Estate on the Hamilton Escarpment in Hamilton, Ontario.

Premise
The show revolves around a group of five friends and their favourite teacher. Together they join the Science Club at Blake Holsey High, a boarding school located in southern Ontario. The name "Blake Holsey" is a pun on the concept of a black hole in that preternatural events constantly happen at the school and affect the students, sometimes as an unexpectedly drastic consequence of their own minor misbehavior. The school's science club considers what a wormhole, a floating Qigong ball, and Pearadyne Industries, a lab that was destroyed years ago right next to the school, all have to do with the mystery.

Episodes

Characters

 Josie Trent (Emma Taylor-Isherwood) is the show's main protagonist. She transfers to Blake Holsey High at the beginning of the series, and is the one who discovered the wormhole first. She is intelligent, curious, and headstrong, and is the one who most wants to know what is going on. In Corrine's words, she has "the hots for Vaughn", but the relationship is a rocky one due to trust issues.
 Corrine Baxter (Shadia Simmons) is Josie's best friend and roommate, Corrine is the so-called "brains" (with a self-claimed IQ of 172) in the Science Club. In contrast to Josie's messiness and rebellious attitude, Corrine is compulsively neat and responsible. Her intelligence tends to be academically inclined, so she often lacks "street-smarts" and demonstrates a rigid attitude towards the more social aspects of her life, which extends to her reciprocated crush on Marshall.
 Lucas Randall (Michael Seater) is a conspiracy theorist, convinced that aliens exist, and coming up with unorthodox theories that often save the day. He is the most driven member of the Science Club to learn the secrets of the school and true intentions of Victor Pearson and Pearadyne Labs, largely due to the fact that he develops a romantic interest in Josie that is largely unrequited as he views Vaughn as a threat. Eventually, he becomes friends with Vaughn and sets his sights on the Josie clone.
 Marshall Wheeler (Noah Reid) is Lucas' best friend and roommate, Marshall is more social and fun loving than Lucas, and helps to keep him down to earth in this way. While he is a notably intelligent and dedicated member of the Science Club, his interests will often drift towards entrepreneurial tendencies and he performs in a band (Magnet 360) with other Blake Holsey students. However, he has trouble expressing his feelings, including his crush on Corrine.
 Vaughn Pearson (Robert Clark) is the fifth student in the Science Club. Vaughn is intelligent but sometimes struggles in school as a result of dyslexia. His father is Victor Pearson, the owner and founder of Pearadyne Industries. Vaughn lives at home with his father for a time, as their house is practically next door to the school, but eventually lives alone at Blake Holsey High. He and Josie develop a mutual attraction to one another, though it is strained by a lack of trust in their relationship. Vaughn at first appears to be a mindless bully, who torments the science club but soon grows to accept them as his friends.
 Professor Noel Zachary (Jeff Douglas) – Professor Zachary, or "Z", is the presiding teacher of the Science Club. Like Josie, he is very curious to find out what is going on at Blake Holsey High. He was able to go to school to become a teacher thanks to a scholarship from Pearadyne Industries, and is the only adult that the Science Club fully trusts. As the Science Club's mentor, he is able to provide background and support for the students.
 Principal Amanda Durst (Valerie Boyle) is the disagreeable Principal Durst is a looming presence over the Science Club, and differs with Professor Zachary's easygoing ways. A former science teacher, she is a reluctant conspirator in Victor Pearson's plans.
 Victor Pearson (Lawrence Bayne) is a benefactor of the school and a constant antagonist to the Science Club's investigations. Secretive and somewhat ruthless, Victor is deeply distrusted by Josie and Lucas, which puts Victor's son Vaughn in a perpetually awkward position. Although Victor Pearson frequently serves as the villain of the show, he is eventually revealed to be "the good guy" in his long struggle to restore Pearadyne and rescue his time-lost wife.
 The Janitor (Tony Munch) is an enigmatic character who seems to understand the mysteries at Blake Holsey High, but reveals little. In the last episode, Josie's clone tells Josie that the Janitor is an Observer's observer, sent from the far future to the past to make sure that the past occurs the way it should.

Significant objects and locations
Qigong Ball/Chi Ball/Floating Ball: Once a normal ball used to handle stress, but became a source of unlimited potential. Josie had used these balls for relaxation, but during Science Club, one was taken from her by Professor Zachary. The other one was affected by the energy of the wormhole in a trip to the 1970s, which made it gravity-less. It defies the laws of physics, which was why a younger Victor Pearson steals it from Josie years ago when he was in Blake Holsey High. Presenting it to Sarah Lynch, they started their plan to create Pearadyne Industries. Using the Chi Ball to power their lab, it caused an explosion, which led to the destruction of Pearadyne and Sarah's disappearance. Consequently, a wormhole formed at Blake Holsey and caused other strange occurrences. When Josie finds the ball again, she assumes that Vaughn and Victor had plotted to use it. Josie steals it back from them and replaces it with the Chi Ball's original normal partner, leaving Victor under the impression that the Chi Ball has somehow lost its power. However, Josie's clone from the future steals the floating ball back and places it back into Victor's hands.
 Wormhole: A powerful vortex that can lead to either the future or the past that can be found in the office of Blake Holsey's science teacher. The exact time and duration the wormhole is open is apparently sporadic and it is uncertain when it will lead. Many agents have attempted to keep the knowledge of the wormhole a secret from everyone, however the energy released from the wormhole has affected the students and the school due to the emotions and conditions of the students.
 Pearadyne Industries/Labs: A laboratory created by Victor Pearson and Sarah Lynch. It was used to create inventions and master quantum physics. On October 4, 1987, Pearadyne was destroyed in an explosion that covered the disappearance of many workers, including Sarah Lynch (Vaughn's mother).

History
Strange Days at Blake Holsey High began airing in Canada on Global as well as VRAK.TV in Quebec. In the United States, meanwhile, it aired on Discovery Kids and NBC. In late March 2003, almost six months after its North American debut, the series was sold to several international markets at the annual MipTV, which was held at Cannes, France. After the series ended, Reruns aired on The Hub until June 25 2011. The British broadcasting network ITV acquired the terrestrial television right to the series, while the pay television rights were sold to Fox Kids (which became Jetix in 2005) in Europe and Latin America, who showed the series in countries including the UK, Argentina, Mexico, Brazil, Chile, and Panama. Fox Kids Europe has a partnership deal with the Disney Channel, which enabled the show to be broadcast in Australia, New Zealand, France and Asia. In Russia (Tomsk), the series airs on CTC. In Denmark, it airs on TV2 Denmark. It also airs in other European countries such as Norway (and other Scandinavian nations), the Netherlands, Portugal, Israel, Poland, Turkey and Italy, as well as Colombia in South America. The children's television channel in the UK, PopGirl, acquired the rights to show the series in 2012 with a host of other acquired programmes including another season of Life With Derek, Family Biz, Mortified and Zoey 101. They were bought together and Black Hole High was the last to be shown. Coming Soon trailers started broadcasting on the channel until its 29 September debut. It was the first airing of the show in almost five years. The series is currently airing.

Fireworks Entertainment, the company behind Strange Days at Blake Holsey High, closed down after the production of Season 3. There were three additional episodes of the series, which aired as a finale film event on January 28, 2006 on the Discovery Kids channel, as "Strange Days Conclusions". As of June 2006, no episode or season of Strange Days at Blake Holsey High has been legally released to DVD in any country. In 2004 it was announced that a DVD box set of season one was to be released in the United Kingdom on July 26, 2004, and websites such as Amazon put up the DVD for pre-order. The release was later pulled without explanation.

Strange Days at Blake Holsey High has been nominated for several awards, but won none. Writers Jeff King, Jeff Schechter and Thérèse Beaupré were nominated for episodes broadcast in the year 2003 at the 31st Daytime Emmy Awards in 2004, in the category Outstanding Writing in a Children's Series. Emma Taylor-Isherwood, Shadia Simmons and Robert Clark were each given Young Artist Award nominations in early 2003, although Taylor-Isherwood was placed in the supporting category, Simmons was elevated to lead, and Clark was considered a "guest actor". Simmons received a second nomination the following year, alongside Talia Schlanger (Madison). The Academy of Canadian Cinema and Television nominated creative team Tony Thatcher, Adam Haight, Jeff King and Kevin May for Best Children's or Youth Fiction Program or Series at the annual Gemini Awards in late 2004, and the Directors Guild of Canada also recognised the show in areas such as sound editing, team achievement, and the product as a whole in 2003 and 2004.

In 2006 Strange Days was nominated for two Emmy Awards: "Outstanding Children's Series" and "Outstanding Writing".

The series went on hiatus in the UK in early September 2006, but returned on November 6, 2006. The show has since been removed from the Jetix schedules.

The series is currently available for streaming on Amazon Prime.

Sequel 
A continuation web series has been announced as a sequel to Strange Days. Called Echoes, the show takes place 16 years after the events of Conclusions and is intended to show how the events impacted individuals in and out of the school. The web series is currently being released as shorts that will lead into a full on sequel. The first episode of Echoes was released on YouTube on June 16, 2022.

Notes

References
 Stewart, Lianne. BlackHole High still strong!. WatchFireworks.com. April 3, 2003. Retrieved August 4, 2005.
 Strange Days at Blake Holsey High. Family Screen Scene. Retrieved August 4, 2005.
 Tillson, Tamsen. Fireworks founder Firestone exits. Variety. May 5, 2003 (in print May 6, 2003). Retrieved August 8, 2005.
 Fox Kids Europe acquires Black Hole High in multi-territory deal. Jetix Europe. March 24, 2003. Retrieved August 8, 2005, using the Wayback Machine.
 Discovery Kids. Discovery Communications Inc. Retrieved August 8, 2005.
 Discovery Kids on NBC Returns This Fall With a Compelling New Comedy, Rousing Reality Shows, Animated Adventures and a Gripping Mystery Series. PR Newswire (press release from Discovery Kids). July 22, 2004. Retrieved August 8, 2005.
 Ford Sullivan, Brian. 'Mutant X' to End as Fireworks' Future Dims. The Futon Critic. April 26, 2004. Retrieved August 8, 2005.
 Edwards, Ian. CanWest puts Fireworks on the block. Playback. April 26, 2004. Retrieved August 8, 2005.
 Lees, Nancy and Edwards, Ian. Cool international market puts Fireworks on the block. Kid Screen magazine, pp. 11. May 1, 2004. Retrieved August 8, 2005.
 Academy of Television Arts & Sciences. The National Television Academy announces 32nd Annual Daytime Emmy Award Nominations. The Futon Critic (press release). March 2, 2005. Retrieved August 8, 2005.
 Moore, Frazier (Associated Press). NBC unwraps Saturday morning package of kids’ adventure programs. The Anniston Star. October 5, 2002. Retrieved August 8, 2005.
 Mutant X Producers: Adam Haight, Executive Producer. MutantX.net. Retrieved August 8, 2005.
 Strange Days at Blake Holsey High. Canada.com. Retrieved August 8, 2005.
 Wener, Kevin. Auchmar estate gets top billing with television productions. Dundas Star News. August 5, 2005. Retrieved August 8, 2005.
 L. Thompson, Susan. Strange Days at Blake Holsey High. Common Sense Media. Retrieved August 8, 2005.

External links

 

2000s Canadian high school television series
2000s Canadian science fiction television series
2000s Canadian teen drama television series
2002 Canadian television series debuts
2006 Canadian television series endings
Canadian fantasy television series
Canadian science fiction television series
Canadian mystery television series
Global Television Network original programming
Television series by Corus Entertainment
English-language television shows
Television shows set in Ontario
Television shows filmed in Hamilton, Ontario
Fiction about wormholes
Television series about size change
Television series about teenagers
2000s Canadian time travel television series
Discovery Kids original programming